GOT, Got, or got may refer to:

People with the name
 François Jules Edmond Got (1822–1901), French actor, comedian, and librettist
 Pascale Got (born 1961), French politician
 Raoul Got (1900–1955), French rugby union player

Arts, entertainment, and media
 Game of Thrones, often abbreviated GoT or GOT, television series
 God of Thunder (video game), a puzzle game
 Ghost of Tsushima, a 2020 action-adventure game

Businesses
 GO Transit, Southern Ontario (reporting mark GOT)
 Gottschalks department store (NYSE symbol GOT)

Other uses
 Got (bull), a cloned fighting bull
 Enzymes
 Geranyl-pyrophosphate—olivetolic acid geranyltransferase
 Glutamic oxaloacetic transaminase or aspartate transaminase
 Global Offset Table, in a computer program
 Göteborg Landvetter Airport, Sweden (IATA code GOT)
 Gothic language, (ISO 639-2 and -3 codes "got")

See also

 Gott (disambiguation)